Laurie Pember (born 1870s/1880s) was an English footballer who played as an inside left with Walsall, Doncaster Rovers, and Coventry City.

He is first known to have been in Division 1 Aston Villa's reserve team in the 1902–03 season.

The following season he moved to Walsall who were playing their first season in the Birmingham League. He ended the season as top scorer with 10 League goals.

Doncaster Rovers, having been elected to Division 2 for the 1904–05 season, signed him for their forward line up. That season he played in 19 League and Cup games and failed to score, though it was one of Rovers worst ever seasons, ending up with 8 points and 23 goals from 34 games. He played mainly as inside left, though moved to the left half back position later in the season.

After being relegated that season, he was released along with most of the squad and went to Coventry City of the Southern League.

References

19th-century births
Year of birth unknown
Year of death unknown
Date of death unknown
English footballers
Association football forwards
Aston Villa F.C. players
Doncaster Rovers F.C. players
Walsall F.C. players
Coventry City F.C. players
English Football League players
Southern Football League players